Patience Cooper was an Anglo-Indian actress, and one of the early superstars of Bollywood. She was the daughter of Phoebe Stella Gamble (born in Calcutta in 1881; daughter of John Frederick Gamble and Phoebe Stella Clement whose mother was Armenian and James Alfred Cooper. An Anglo-Indian born in Howrah, West Bengal, and baptised on 30 May 1902, Cooper had a successful career in both silent and sound films. She is credited with the first double roles of Indian cinema—as twin sisters in Patni Prataap and as mother and daughter in Kashmiri Sundari, even though earlier in 1917, actor Anna Salunke had played roles of both the male lead character Ram and the female lead character Seeta in the film Lanka Dahan.

Stage career
Cooper began her career as a dancer in Bandmann's Musical Comedy, a Eurasian troupe. She later joined Jamshedji Framji Madan's Corinithian Stage Company as an actress.

Film career

Cooper first made an impact with Nala Damayanti (1920). The film starred Keki Adajania as Nala and Cooper as Damayanti. The film was a big budget Madan Theatre production and was directed by Eugenio de Liguoro, known in Italy for his Orientalist spectacles like Fascino d'Oro (1919). Nala Damayanti was famous for its special effects at the time — Narada's ascent of Mount Meru to heaven, the transformations of four gods into impersonations of Nala, the transformation of Kali into a serpent among others.

Her next film was Vishnu Avtar, released in 1921. De Liguoro also directed Dhruva Chartitra (1921), a mythological based on the legend of Dhruva whose quest for eternal knowledge and salvation was rewarded when he became the brightest star in the heavens, the pole star also known as Dhruvatara. The film was made as a bid for an international breakthrough for Madan Theatres and featured many Europeans in the cast along with Cooper who played the female lead, Suniti.

One of Cooper's biggest successes was Pati Bhakti (1922). Cooper played Leelavati in the film, directed by the great JJ Madan himself, advocating that women should be devoted to their husband. The film is regarded as her greatest film and was also involved in a small controversy as in Madras, the censor demanded that a dance number be removed on the grounds of obscenity.

Cooper also played perhaps the first ever double roles in Hindi films — Patni Pratap (1923), where she played two sisters and Kashmiri Sundari (1924), where she played mother and daughter.

Cooper did films right through to the mid-1930s. One of her last major films was Zehari Saap (1933). The film was a typical Cooper vehicle about a medieval chieftain's revolt against the good Nawab Bakar Malik. The nawab's outlaw son vows revenge and finally all's well that ends well. The dramatic conflict in the film sees the chieftain wanting to marry the princess, whom he had raised as his own daughter.

Cooper acted in over 40 films until she retired in 1944, after performing in her last film, Iraada.  Cooper was often cast in the role of a sexually troubled but innocent woman, always at the centre of moral dilemmas, often caused by the men in her lives.

A major aspect of Cooper's star image was the successful achievement of the 'Hollywood look' in spite of different light and technical conditions. Her distinctively Anglo-Indian features, like dark eyes, sharp features, ebony hair and light skin tone, allowed technicians to experiment with the imported technique of eye-level lighting and achieve an appearance similar to Hollywood stars of the silent era.

The low number of women, especially Hindus, in the film industry during the 1920s (due to conservative attitudes) meant Anglo-Indian actresses like Cooper, were in demand. Her appearance in a string of successful films has led her to being called the first ever female Indian film star.

Later life
It is generally supposed Cooper married Mirza Ahmad Ispahani Saheb (MAH Ispahani), a well-known Indian businessman. In 1947, they migrated to Pakistan. Actually she was married to MAH Ispahani at the age of 21 and divorced soon after. She then married Gul Hamid Khan, one of the first early silent movie actors. He died six years later from Hodgkin's Disease. She remained friends with MAH Ispahani until the end of her life. Cooper changed her name to Sabra Begum and lived the last of her days with her two adopted daughters Zeenat and Haleema in Karachi, Pakistan. Her foster daughter Syeda Nafees Rizvi lives in Houston, Texas, USA. She fostered and/or adopted 17 children during her lifetime. Cooper died in 1993.

Filmography

References

External links 

 

1905 births
1983 deaths
Indian silent film actresses
Actresses from Kolkata
Anglo-Indian people
Indian people of Armenian descent
Actresses of European descent in Indian films
Indian emigrants to Pakistan
Pakistani people of Anglo-Indian descent
Pakistani people of Armenian descent
People from British India
Indian film actresses
20th-century Indian actresses
Actresses in Hindi cinema